Molly Secours is a Nashville-based filmmaker, author, and activist.

Secours directed and edited the music video Just Waitin which featured the music of singer-songwriter John Prine and the images of Nashville photographer Jack Spencer. She directed Two Kings, a music video about Elvis Presley and Martin Luther King Jr. which featured the singers Pam Tillis and Kris Thomas. In 2022 she is making the documentary Scouting for Diamonds that focuses on the relation between talent scouts and baseball.

As an author, her book White Privilege Pop Quiz: Reflecting on Whiteness asked White people to be more introspective regarding their racial sensibility. People can take her quiz on her website.

Secours is a proponent of social change and democracy and women's rights. A particular issue for her is racial inequity in such areas as criminal justice and education and employment and healthcare, and she is an advocate for greater awareness of white privilege. She worked at The Oasis Center for Women and Girls to help African-American and Latino youth learn life skills via videos. She has worked with journalist John Seigenthaler and with writer John Egerton and with civil rights activist Reverend Will D. Campbell.

Secours was born in Massena, New York, a town where she knew of only one Black person. She moved out west to become a computer executive, and then moved to Nashville in 1994. She won a grant from George Soros's Open Society Institute and used it to make documentaries with kids in juvenile justice. Her documentary Welcome to My Hood appeared in 2001. Secours is a cancer survivor. Her experience battling Stage IV cancer changed her outlook on life.

References

External links
 Just waitin' YouTube video by John Prine directed by Molly Secours
 Two Kings YouTube video directed by Secours

Living people
People from Nashville, Tennessee
21st-century American women writers
Female music video directors
American anti-racism activists
People from Massena, New York
American women documentary filmmakers
American documentary film directors
Women civil rights activists
Film producers from Tennessee
Audiobook narrators
Year of birth missing (living people)